William Weston (1882–1948) was an English professional footballer who played as an inside forward. He joined Crystal Palace from Sunderland in 1906. He moved on to Blackpool the following year.

Career statistics
Source:

References

1882 births
1948 deaths
People from North Northamptonshire
English footballers
Association football inside forwards
Sunderland A.F.C. players
Crystal Palace F.C. players
Blackpool F.C. players
Nelson F.C. players
Spennymoor United F.C. players
Southern Football League players
English Football League players
Northern Football League players